Hvissinge (or Hvessinge on some maps, though not in local signage) is a suburb approximately 13 km west of central Copenhagen. Originally a small village, but in the 1970s the town grew quickly along with Glostrup. It is part of Glostrup Municipality and situated 2 km north east of the city centre.

Notable people 
 Jens Østerholm (1928 in Hvissinge – 2006) a Danish film actor

References

Geography of Denmark
Copenhagen metropolitan area
Glostrup Municipality